Mickaël Pontal (born 30 April 1980) is a French professional footballer. He currently plays in the Championnat National for Hyères FC.

Pontal played at the professional level in Ligue 1 and Ligue 2 for AS Saint-Étienne.

1980 births
Living people
People from Guilherand-Granges
French footballers
Ligue 1 players
Ligue 2 players
AS Saint-Étienne players
ASOA Valence players
AS Cannes players
Association football defenders
Sportspeople from Ardèche
Mediterranean Games bronze medalists for France
Mediterranean Games medalists in football
Competitors at the 2001 Mediterranean Games
Footballers from Auvergne-Rhône-Alpes